Vasilios Vasilakos (born 7 September 1960) is a Greek former professional footballer, who played as an attacking midfielder.

Club career
Vasilakos started his football career from Almyros Volos and in the summer of 1979 he was transferred to PAOK. He played 8 seasons, where he won 1 Championship in 1985 and played as a finalist in 2 Greek Cup finals in 1983 and in 1985. In the summer of 1987 Zafiropoulos the president of AEK Athens brought Vasilakos to the club.

He stood out for his good execution in set-pieces but also for his ability in assists, a fact that made his then teammate top scorer of the league in the season, Henrik Nielsen, credit him with a large part of his success. His goal against PAOK at Toumba Stadium on 6 September 1987 made him the only footballer to have scored in the Toumba stadium, in a Double-headed eagles derby, playing for both clubs. However, the name of Vasilakos was associated with one of the biggest scandals of the season. AEK were drawn to face Olympiacos in the third round of the Greek Cup. In the first match at Karaiskakis Stadium, AEK took the lead with a direct foul by Vasilakos, but were equalized. The rematch took place on February 10 in Nea Filadelfeia, a few days after the impressive victory of the "yellow-blacks" against Olympiacos for the championship, at the same stadium. On the eve of the match, a big scandal broke out when AEK complained that the president of Olympiacos, George Koskotasis tried to bribe both Vasilakos and the goalkeeper, Theologis Papadopoulos through the team's former player Dinos Ballis. AEK were defeated by 1–3 and were eliminated. In the trial that followed, the only one who will be punished for attempted bribery is Balis. The "fallout" of this case affected the team in the league race, which, combined with another scandal, that of the "Tsingov case" was eventually lost. Vasilakos was releashed from the club as his name was marked from this scandal.

Afterwards, he played for 3 years for Panionios, where he competed in another final of the Greek Cup in 1989 losing 3–1 to Panathinaikos. He moved to Olympiacos Volos before ending his career in 1994.

After football
Vasilakos lives in Thessaloniki and is quite often hosted on local radio stations, where he comments on the happenings of PAOK.

Honours

PAOK
Alpha Ethniki: 1984–85

References

External links

1960 births
Living people
Greek footballers
PAOK FC players
AEK Athens F.C. players
Panionios F.C. players
Olympiacos Volos F.C. players
Super League Greece players
Association football midfielders
Footballers from Volos